Sergiy Stakhovsky and Potito Starace were the defending champions, but they chose not to participate this year.Pablo Cuevas and Marcel Granollers won in the final 4–6, 7–5, [10–8] against František Čermák and Michal Mertiňák.

Seeds

Draw

External links
 Main Draw

Kremlin Cup
Kremlin Cup